The Volvo International, also known as the Pilot Pen International, was a professional tennis tournament played on clay courts from 1973 to 1984 and on outdoor hard courts from 1985 to 1998. It was first held at the Mount Washington Resort in Bretton Woods, New Hampshire in the United States in 1973 after Rod Laver had run a successful summer camp there. The International was originally part of the Grand Prix tennis circuit until the formation of the ATP Tour in 1990, when it became part of the Championship Series until its dissolution.

The event moved to several American locations during its run, including Mount Cranmore in North Conway, New Hampshire, from 1975 to 1984, Stratton Mountain Resort at Stratton Mountain, Vermont, from 1985 to 1989, and eventually to New Haven, Connecticut from 1990 until 1998, before it was discontinued.

In 2005, the ATP event at Long Island (known as the TD Waterhouse Cup) was moved to New Haven, where it merged with the WTA Tour's Pilot Pen Tennis. The current ATP Pilot Pen event is considered to be a continuation of the Long Island event rather than of the International.

Finals

Singles

Doubles

References

 
Defunct tennis tournaments in the United States
Clay court tennis tournaments
Hard court tennis tournaments in the United States
Grand Prix tennis circuit
ATP Tour
Recurring sporting events established in 1973
Recurring sporting events disestablished in 1998
1973 establishments in New Hampshire
1998 disestablishments in Connecticut
Tennis in New Hampshire
Tennis in Connecticut
Sports in New Haven, Connecticut
Windham County, Vermont
Carroll County, New Hampshire